Razdolye is a rural locality (a settlement) and the administrative center of Razdolyevskoye Rural Settlement, Kolchuginsky District, Vladimir Oblast, Russia. The population was 836 as of 2010. There are 8 streets.

Geography 
Razdolye is located 7 km southeast of Kolchugino (the district's administrative centre) by road. Stenki is the nearest rural locality.

References 

Rural localities in Kolchuginsky District